Quanita Adams is stage and screen actress living in Cape Town, South Africa. She has performed in the movies Forgiveness (2004, alongside Arnold Vosloo), Cape of Good Hope (2004) and Skeem (2011). She has appeared on stage in notable plays, including Truth in Translation and At Her Feet. She is the 2008 winner of the Fleur du Cap Theatre Award for Best Supporting Actress for her roles in Cissie, the 2004 winner of the Fleur du Cap Theatre Award for Best Actress for Valley Song and At Her Feet, and the 2003 winner of the Fleur du Cap Theatre Award for Best Ensemble for For Colored Girls. Quanita also plays the role of Mother Laetitia in the SAFTA-winning KykNET drama, Arendsvlei. Furthermore, Adams created the television series Riveiria,  based on a grade 7 girl growing up during Apartheid, as well as Vinkel en Koljander.

References

External links

Year of birth missing (living people)
Living people
South African stage actresses
South African film actresses
Actresses from Cape Town
21st-century South African actresses